Ust-Yazva is a rural locality (a settlement) and the administrative center of Ust-Yazvinskoye Rural Settlement, Krasnovishersky District, Perm Krai, Russia. The population was 564 as of 2010. There are 17 streets.

Geography 
Ust-Yazva is located 37 km southwest of Krasnovishersk (the district's administrative centre) by road. Danilov Lug is the nearest rural locality.

References 

Rural localities in Krasnovishersky District